Florencia Aimone (born 23 November 1990) is a team handball player from Argentina. She defends Argentina, such as at the 2011 World Women's Handball Championship in Brazil. Florencia has a master's degree in architecture from the University of Buenos Aires. She has experience in project, construction management and interior design. Before coming to Australia, Florencia worked for an architecture studio, participating in a variety of residential and commercial projects throughout Argentina. She also worked for particular projects, as a Construction Manager and Interior Designer Assistant, where she gained versatility and knowledge in different fields.

References

1990 births
Living people
Argentine female handball players
20th-century Argentine women
21st-century Argentine women